A Fielding Bible Award recognizes the best defensive player for each fielding position in Major League Baseball (MLB) based on statistical analysis. John Dewan and Baseball Info Solutions conduct the annual selection process, which commenced in 2006. The awards are voted on by 10 sabermetrically inclined journalists and bloggers including Dewan, sabermetric pioneer Bill James, and writers such as Peter Gammons, NBC Sports' Joe Posnanski, SB Nation editor Rob Neyer, and ESPN analyst Doug Glanville. The awards have historically been announced before the Gold Glove Awards, the traditional measurement of fielding excellence. Dewan wrote that this award cannot equal the prestige of the Gold Glove, which started 50 years earlier, but it provides an alternative.

Voting process
Dewan felt that statistics in addition to visual observation and subjective judgment are integral in determining the best defensive players. The Fielding Bible Award attempts to address the deficiencies Dewan saw with the  Gold Glove Award, previously the only organized subjective judgment of fielding. The voting for the Fielding Bible Awards are for the entire MLB, and not separated between the National League and the American League; playing defense was not perceived to be any different between the two leagues. The voters select the best defensive player at each position with the best player given 10 points, the second best nine points and so forth. From the award's inception, the specific outfield positions have been picked individually instead of choosing three generic outfielders, a practice employed by the Gold Glove Awards from 1961 to 2010. Each voter selects 10 players for each position. The candidates for each position are defined beforehand to eliminate the possibility of a vote going to a player who was not really playing the position. (Rafael Palmeiro won the 1999 AL Gold Glove at first base despite being primarily a designated hitter and appearing in only 28 games as a first baseman that season.) In 2014, a multi-position award was introduced to honor a player who plays multiple positions, with a minimum of 600 innings played at any position but no more than 70 percent of those innings at a specific position. The voting for awards is summarized and published for each position, identifying who everybody voted for. This aims to instill accountability among the voters and provide insight into the process to the public.

Voters use sabermetrics to account for a defenders' range. The traditional standard of a high fielding percentage could be impacted by a player who does not make many errors but also does not get to many balls.

Critical reception
There have been some major differences between the player selections made for the Fielding Bible Awards and the Gold Glove Awards. The Boston Globe writer Peter Abraham said the Fielding Bible Awards "are far more accurate (and accountable)" than the Gold Glove awards since statistics are used along with the opinions of the expert panel.  The Gold Gloves are selected by managers and coaches that may have seen a player as few as six times all season. Geoff Baker of The Seattle Times said the votes for the Gold Gloves rely largely on a player's past reputation. Jeff Wilson of The Southern Illinoisan believes that Gold Glove results are unduly influenced by a player's offensive prowess. Derek Jeter, winner of multiple Gold Gloves, believes that many defensive factors cannot be quantified. Rustin Dodd of The Kansas City Star noted that people "point out the primitive nature of defensive stats — even if that's more perception now than reality."

In 2013, the Gold Glove award partnered with Society for American Baseball Research (SABR) to add a sabermetric component to its vote. Afterwards, Jay Jaffe of Sports Illustrated wrote that the Gold Gloves "appear to have significantly closed the gap on their more statistically-driven counterparts."

Past winners

See also

Wilson Defensive Player of the Year Award
This Year in Baseball Awards, including Best Defensive Player
MLB awards by other organizations

References

Sources

Further reading
 Fielding Bible website
 Baseball Info Solutions website

Awards established in 2006
Major League Baseball trophies and awards